Downtown Burbank Post Office is a post office in Downtown Burbank, California, operated by the United States Postal Service (USPS).

It was put on the National Register of Historic Places (NRHP) on January 11, 1985.

Gilbert Stanley Underwood designed the building, which was built under the Works Progress Administration (WPA), began construction in 1937 and which had its dedication on April 30, 1938.

In 2014 the Glenoaks Post Office in Burbank closed, with Downtown Burbank absorbing its functions.

References

Burbank, California